Domestic may refer to:

In the home
 Anything relating to the human home or family
 A domestic animal, one that has undergone domestication
 A domestic appliance, or home appliance
 A domestic partnership
 Domestic science, sometimes called family and consumer science
 Domestic violence
 A domestic worker

In the state
 Domestic affairs, matters relating to the internal government of a Sovereign state
 Domestic airport
 Domestic flight
 Domestic policy, the internal policy of a state

Other
 Domestic, Indiana, an unincorporated community in Wells County
 Domestikos, a Byzantine title
 Domestic of the Schools, commander-in-chief of the Byzantine army in the 9th-11th centuries
 Domestic (film), a 2012 Romanian comedy film

See also
 Domestic discipline (disambiguation)
 Housekeeper (disambiguation)